The Independent Electrical Contractors, Inc. (IEC) is a national trade association in the United States for merit shop electrical and systems contractors. IEC has about 3,500 member companies in about 52 chapters throughout the country.

Education and training
IEC provides workforce training for apprentices, journeymen, and foremen, which is recognized by the U.S. Department of Labor’s Bureau of Apprenticeship and Training. Training takes place in more than 50 IEC chapter training centers nationwide and is conducted in accordance with the requirements established by the U.S. Department of Labor and are recognized by the U.S. Department of Veterans Affairs. Graduates of IEC's apprenticeship program are recommended by the American Council of Education to receive up to 41 college credits. IEC chapters offer continuing education courses for professional contractors, including the Certified Professional Electrician Credential.

IEC Foundation
Founded in 1996, the Independent Electrical Contractors Foundation (IECF) works to fund, promote, and support education in the electrical and communications industries. The IECF works to improving the profession and the quality of life in its members' communities. The IECF has provided over $5 million in cash and equipment to IEC training centers across the country.

OSHA Alliance
IEC is a member of the U.S. Occupational Safety and Health Administration (OSHA) Alliance program, which provides members and other industry personnel with information and access to training resources designed to protect employees' health and safety. Its main goal is reducing and preventing exposure to fall and arc flash hazards, which are major areas of concern in the electrical contracting industry.

References

External links

Electrical trades organizations
Trade associations based in the United States